Trams in Liège, Belgium, date back to 1871 which is when the first tramcars using rail tracks and powered by horse traction were introduced in the city.   The number and variety of horse-trams proliferated.

Electrification began in 1893 and was followed by a decade of rapid network expansion.   After 1945 the network was progressively reduced, however, as motor buses were thought to offer better flexibility and lower maintenance and running costs.  The last of the tram services for more than half a century was withdrawn in November 1967.

In 2014 work began on constructing two new tramlines in Liège, with a scheduled operating commencement date in 2017.   The scheduled opening of the first line has subsequently slipped to Spring 2018.

History

Early years
The first electric tram service in Liège, which was also the first electric tram service in Belgium, opened to the public on 9 August 1893, connecting the northern Coronmeuse quarter (fr) with Herstal, to the east of the city.   Only 200 meters of the line actually ran in the city centre.   On 22 October 1896 the two principal horse-powered tramlines were converted to electric power, so that there was now an electric tram crossing the city centre.   In 1897 a line was added connecting Chênée (then considered a separate town) with the centre of the city, and Angleur received a tram connection in 1905.  A fourth line was also installed in 1905 for that year's World Fair at Liège.

An aspect of tram operations in the city was the large number of competing operators.   By the start of the twentieth century there had been some consolidation of the businesses involved, but in 1905 there were still six different organisations operating tram in Liège, some in public ownership and some privately owned.   In addition to the electric trams the lines were also used by steam trams at this time.  It was only in 1927 that the Liège tram network was "unified".

Decline and closure
The tram collection at the   contains numerous tramcars that predate the Second World War and some that predate the First World War, which were decommissioned only in the mid 1960s.   It is correspondingly difficult to find any evidence of trams having been added to the city fleet after the 1930s. although most of the tramcars were subject to at least one major overhaul or rebuild exercise during their lives.   In view of the challenging topography (at least by Belgian standards) of Liège, and the visible absence of investment, it can have come as no surprise when the last tram services were withdrawn towards the end of 1967.

Métro aborted
Major investment in a Liège underground Metro system was envisaged and construction eventually began towards the end of the 1970s.   A tunnel was started, but the Metro never saw the light of day.   The tunnel section that was completed enjoys enduring notoriety as one of Belgium's white elephants.   It is used for storage.

The trams will return

In 2008 there was agreement in principle among regional political leaders on reintroducing trams to Liège in order to address the traffic saturation issues from which the city suffers, particularly in its low lying central parts by the river Meuse.  There has followed extensive investigation and public consultation, before the route of the first line was fixed, in October 2011.   The regional government of Wallonia gave the final go-ahead at the end of 2011, although at that stage it was stated that further discussion remained necessary on project funding.   In the end the decision was taken to proceed on the basis of a Public–private partnership, inspired by agreements used for recent investments for the London Underground.

Project summary
The total line length will be , comprising a  length from Seraing to Herstal and a further  for a short branch connection to Bressoux (fr).

The projected cost of €315 million compares with an estimated cost of €484 million for building the entire line at once. The decision not to proceed at once with the full line drew criticism.

The route will run close to the river Meuse, along its left bank.   It will pass the modern esplanade opposite the new main railway station, as well as the Avenue Charles Rogier (fr) and the Boulevard de la Sauvenière (fr).   It will continue along to the Saint-Léonard and Coronmeuse wharfs.

Construction was scheduled to run from 2015 till 2018.

Third Eurostat rejection
By August 2013 tenders for the construction had been received from three consortia. That was narrowed down to two on 3 April 2014, when the remaining contenders were invited to submit their final bids for 15 September 2014. The final decision was announced on 10 December 2014, in favour of the so-called "Mobiliège" consortium (ALSTOM – BAM PPP PGGM – DG Infra).

The signing of the DBFM (Design, Build, Finance, Maintain) contract was planned for the spring of 2015. After a preparatory studies phase, construction was to start in the autumn. However in March 2015, Eurostat, the European body for the control of accounting standards, reviewed the financing dossier for the Liège tram, and in July 2015, for the second time and following changes to the file, issued a negative opinion.

On 16 January 2016, the City of Liège announced that it has received a negative opinion from Eurostat for the third time, and launched a citizen petition in favor of the tram.

The second public contract, and the final award to the TramArdent consortium

A new call for tenders was published in March 2016, and by the 5 October 2017, two bids had been received, from Alstom in France and Construcciones y Auxiliar de Ferrocarriles (CAF) in Spain. On 10 February 2017, Eurostat approved the financial package. The final choice of the manufacturer should have been made in the first quarter of 2018.

However, the transfer of the TEC group to a Walloon Transport Operator (OTW) entailed a further postponement. On 19 September 2018, Opérateur de transport de Wallonie (OWT - new name of the SRWT) awarded the contract to the temporary association "TramArdent" comprising CAF, which will supply the Urbos vehicles, and Colas which will build the infrastructure.

References

Liège
Liège 
Tram transport in Belgium